The 2020 season is the Geelong Football Club's 121st season in the Australian Football League (AFL), the tenth with Chris Scott as senior coach and ninth with Joel Selwood as captain.

Geelong participated in the 2020 Marsh Community Series as part of its pre-season schedule, and the club's regular season began 21 March against  at GIANTS Stadium where they lost by 32 points.

Overview 

Chris Scott continued as the club's senior coach for a tenth season, and Joel Selwood continued as the club's captain for a ninth year. Harry Taylor stepped down from his position as co-vice-captain and was replaced by Mark Blicavs. In addition, Patrick Dangerfield retained his position as co-vice-captain. Furthermore, Mitch Duncan, Tom Stewart and Zach Tuohy kept their positions in the leadership group, with Mark O'Connor joining the group.

Car manufacturer Ford Australia was the major sponsor for the 2020 season, making it the 96th year of the partnership. GMHBA the naming rights sponsor for Geelong's home ground Kardinia Park, continuing a ten-year deal signed in October 2017 for the venue to be known as GMHBA Stadium.

Season Summary

Ladder

References 

Australian Football League
2020 Australian Football League season
2020 in Australian rules football
Geelong Football Club seasons